In Eswatini, an umphakatsi (plural imiphakatsi) is an administrative subdivision smaller than an inkhundla; there are 360 imiphakatsi in the country, each approximately equivalent to a local community. In western societies it could be also equivalent to a township. Imiphakatsi are either Royal villages with a Royal kraal or chief residences which are administered under a Swazi chief or a Royal prince through Swazi Law and Custom. The official residence of the Ndlovukati at Ludzidzini is also designated an umphakatsi.

Subdivisions of Eswatini